is a 2002 sports film directed by Japanese filmmaker Fumihiko Sori. It is based on Taiyō Matsumoto's manga of the same name and is about the friendship between two high school table tennis players.

The film concentrates on these two friends, their two mentors, and three players who they encounter at high school table tennis tournaments. It explores the different motivations and philosophies that they have towards table tennis and tries to portray the excitement and subtlety of the sport.

Plot
Peco (real name Yutaka Hoshino) and Smile (real name Makoto Tsukimoto) are members of Katase High table tennis club. Peco is charismatic and has a passion for the sport, while Smile is introverted. Tsukimoto's friends in the table tennis club nicknamed him "Smile" as he does not smile often. The characters have known each other, and Demon (Akuma 悪魔, real name Manabu Sakuma), since primary school. Despite Smile's greater natural talent, he sees the sport as simply a way to pass the time, and often lets less able players such as Peco beat him out of consideration for their feelings.

Peco hears about a new table tennis player brought over from Shanghai, China, to beat local hero Dragon for Tsujido Academy: "China". Dragon (real name Ryūichi Kazama) plays for the fight, in search of a worthy opponent. In an informal set, China (real name Kong Wenge) completely shuts out Peco, winning 21 to 0. Peco is devastated by the loss. This is compounded at the next inter-school competition where Sakuma also beats Peco in the third round of the tournament. Smile, meanwhile, lets China beat him out of kindness for his opponent. Sakuma's team from Kaio Academy—led by Dragon, a top competitor and strict disciplinarian—wins the overall competition.

Sakuma confronts Peco, telling him he lost because he was coasting. Peco jumps into a river as a symbolic rebirth and trains with Tamura to get back into his school team. In the next high school tournament, Peco beats China in the first round and Dragon in the semi-final despite an injured knee. During this match, Dragon experiences the joy of playing table tennis for the first time. Peco and Smile meet in the final. Several years later, Peco has fulfilled his dream of playing professionally in Europe, while Smile helps a young boy learn the sport. A photo behind Smile shows Peco, Smile and Dragon having taken first, second and third places respectively.

Cast
The cast includes Yosuke Kubozuka (Peco), Arata (Smile), Sam Lee (China), Shidō Nakamura (Dragon), Kōji Ōkura (Akuma), Naoto Takenaka (Butterfly Joe, the high school coach) and Mari Natsuki (Obaba, Peco's mentor).

Soundtrack

 Yumegiwa Last Boy—Supercar (4:11)
 Spring Sponsor—Subtle (4:55)
 Strobolights—Supercar (3:27)
 La Peggi (Ping Pong Original Short Size)—Takkyū Ishino (4:58)
 E.D.E.N. (Ping Pong Original Short Size)—Dub Squad (5:23)
 Rise (Ping Pong Original Short Size)—Sugar Plant (6:37)
 Breakdown—[Ma-O] (2:21)
 Before (Ping Pong Original Short Size)—Group (6:02)
 Canned Beat—World Famous (3:01)
 No Sun (Ping Pong Original Short Size)—Yoshinori Sunahara (4:28)
 Scatterin' Monkey—Boom Boom Satellites (5:26)
 Cicabow (Ping Pong Original Short Size)—Cicada (4:52)
 The Good Timing of World of Love Song—Yoshinori Sunahara (2:21)
 Angelic Butterfly—[Ma-O] (1:51)
 Free Your Soul—Supercar (4:19)

Reception
The review aggregator website Rotten Tomatoes reported an 75% approval rating with an average rating of 6,60/10, based on 20 critic reviews.

Ping Pong was nominated for eight categories at the 26th Japan Academy Film Prize in 2003; Shidō Nakamura won the 'Newcomer of the Year' prize for his performance as Dragon.

Jeannette Catsoulis from The New York Times praised the film and stated "Stylistically stunning and completely nuts, Ping Pong is nevertheless perceptive about male social hierarchies and the benefits of knowing your place. Between the pistoning elbows and whizzing balls, the director, Sori, repeatedly films his protagonists sitting on stairs, subtly altering their positions as the story progresses. In fact, when not busying himself with slow-motion sweat and eye-popping backspins, Sori has a lot to say about the heart-versus-skill conflict and the demands of natural talent. It's just difficult to hear him over the noise of those balls".

References

External links
  
 
 

2002 films
Live-action films based on manga
Films directed by Fumihiko Sori
2000s Japanese-language films
2000s sports comedy films
Table tennis films
New People films
Japanese sports comedy films
2002 comedy films
2000s Japanese films